Tobias Martin Hayles-Docherty (born 30 January 1999) is an English professional footballer who last played as a midfielder for Walsall.

Playing career
Hayles-Docherty came through the Walsall youth team to first make the first team bench in April 2017. He made his EFL League One debut as a 68th-minute substitute for Maziar Kouhyar in a 1–0 defeat to Port Vale at the Bescot Stadium on 25 April 2017.

On 28 September 2018, Hayles-Docherty was sent out on a one-month loan deal at Halesowen Town until 3 November.

He was released by Walsall at the end of the 2018–19 season.

Career statistics

References

1999 births
Living people
English footballers
Association football midfielders
Walsall F.C. players
English Football League players
Halesowen Town F.C. players